The Cat Creeps  is a 1930 American pre-Code mystery film directed by Rupert Julian based on the 1922 play The Cat and the Canary by John Willard. The film is a sound remake of The Cat and the Canary (1927). Starring Helen Twelvetrees, Raymond Hackett, Neil Hamilton, Lilyan Tashman, Jean Hersholt, Elizabeth Patterson, and Montagu Love.

Developed as a remake, Universal Pictures initially tried to re-cast Laura La Plante from The Cat and the Canary, but on finding her unavailable re-titled the film to The Cat Creeps. While filming was done during the day, the sets were used at night for a Spanish-language version of the film. The Cat Creeps was first shown in New York on November 7, 1930 and received critical acclaim from contemporary reviews finding it creepy and praising its cast, specifically Helen Twelvetrees and Raymond Hackett. The film is currently a lost film, with only two minutes of footage known to exist in the 1932 Universal short film Boo!.

Cast

Production
When Universal Studios planned to remake the silent film The Cat and the Canary, the studio attempted to re-hire its star Laura La Plante to repeat the leading role she had in that film. La Plante was unavailable for the role, and was later given to Helen Twelvetrees, leading to the title being changed to The Cat Creeps. A Spanish-language version titled La Voluntad del muerto was simultaneously filmed on the same sets of The Cat Creeps at night. starring Lupita Tovar and directed by George Melford, was filmed by at night on the same sets used for The Cat Creeps during the day.

Release
The Cat Creeps opened in New York on November 7, 1930.  La Voluntad del muerto was released in November 1930.

Less than two minutes of The Cat Creeps survive, as they were incorporated into the 1932 Universal short film Boo! The soundtrack of the film still exist on discs.

Remakes
The Cat Creeps was remade as The Cat and the Canary in 1939 with Bob Hope and Paulette Goddard with a more comedic approach. Elizabeth Patterson repeated her role in the film as Aunt Susan. The film was repeated again in the late 1970s as The Cat and the Canary in the United Kingdom as a more horror oriented film.

In 1946, Universal released a second film titled The Cat Creeps which is unrelated to the original story and borrowed more from the 1940 film Horror Island.

Reception

From contemporary reviews, a review in Film Daily declared the film as "excellent" with "an all-around fine cast [...] Rupert Julian's direction is intelligent and effective."  Exhibitor's Forum found that the film was a "mystery thriller expertly produced with an excellent cast" specifically noting Twelvetrees and Raymond Hackett.  Picture Play Magazine also liked the film, calling it "well done."

Variety found the film to production values to be "first rate and the punch thrills neatly timed and built" while finding that "the creepy thrill value is still there, but in the translation from silent to sound it has been badly slowed up."  A reviewer in The Bioscope found the film to be a "lured enough melodrama" and that "it is rather clap-trap stuff, [...] but it nevertheless achieves its object." as well as praising the acting of Helen Twelvretress, Raymond Hackett, Neil Hamilton and Blanche Frederici.  Harrison's Reports declared the film to be "a weird mystery drama, filled with thrills and with considerable comedy. It is well act and well presented and it keeps one in suspense to the very end" Silver Screen lamented that the original The Cat and the Canary film was "a much better mystery-thriller" and the "good cast is wasted" concluding the film to be "a very sad affair."

See also
List of lost films
List of incomplete or partially lost films

References

Footnotes

Sources

External links

 
 
 

1930 films
American black-and-white films
Remakes of American films
American films based on plays
American mystery films
Films directed by Rupert Julian
Films set in country houses
Lost American films
American multilingual films
Sound film remakes of silent films
Universal Pictures films
1930 lost films
1930s English-language films
1930s American films
1930 mystery films